St Stephen's Uniting Church is a heritage-listed Uniting Church located at 197 Macquarie Street, in the Sydney central business district, in the City of Sydney local government area of New South Wales, Australia. Developed initially as St Stephen's Presbyterian Church, it was designed by Finlay Munro Jnr and John Reid and built from 1935 to 1937 by Kell & Rigby. It was added to the New South Wales State Heritage Register on 3 September 2004.

History 
The present St Stephen's Church is the second church of that name in Macquarie Street, the fourth in the precinct. The congregation were originally housed in St Stephen's Church in Phillip Street, and later in the Iron Church in Macquarie Street.  The second St Stephen's was located south of the present church in Macquarie Street.

St Stephen's was designed by John Reid and Finlay Munro Jnr  in the Interwar Gothic style remaining in central Sydney. The name of the church was selected because its geographical location and links to Parliament of New South Wales were seen to reflect those of St Stephen's of Westminster with the British Houses of Parliament.

Building description 
St Stephen's Church is designed in the Inter War Gothic style and occupies a prime location in Macquarie Street, opposite State Parliament.  The masonry building includes a rectangular church and gallery, hall, offices and ancillary spaces. The main elevation is sandstone with carved tracery and leadlight windows and is symmetrical about the eastern window.  Stairs located at the north and south sides of the entrance vestibule provide access to the gallery and Ferguson Hall below.  The interiors feature extensive polished timber panelling and plaster ceilings that draw inspiration from traditional English Perpendicular Gothic.

As at 10 March 2004, the physical condition of the building is good.

Heritage listing 
As at 4 March 2004, St Stephen's Uniting Church is likely to be of State significance.  It is historically and socially significant as the focus of the Parish of St Stephen's, formed in 1842 and is associated with a number of prominent members of Sydney, including Churchmen, Statesmen and Military. Its history is interwoven with the development of the Presbyterian and Uniting Churches in NSW and Australia, in which it has played a prominent role.  St Stephen's has been continuously located within the Macquarie Street precinct for over 150 years.  The church has aesthetic significance as an example of the Inter War Gothic style of architecture, and as one of three extant churches in that style in central Sydney.  It is part of a group of high quality and historic buildings lining Macquarie Street and contributing to that historic precinct.

St Stephen's Uniting Church was listed on the New South Wales State Heritage Register on 3 September 2004 having satisfied the following criteria.

The place is important in demonstrating the course, or pattern, of cultural or natural history in New South Wales.

The site of St Stephen's Uniting Church is historically significance as the former site of Burdekin House, one of Sydney's Colonial social landmarks for over 90 years.  Built in 1841-1842 by Thomas Burdekin, it remained in family ownership until sold in 1924.

St Stephen's is historically significant as the focus of the Congregation of St Stephen's Church, formed in 1842.  Since the 1840s St Stephen's has been a part of the spiritual life of the people of Sydney.  It continues to make an important contribution to the development of religious thought and observance in New South Wales.

The place has a strong or special association with a person, or group of persons, of importance of cultural or natural history of New South Wales's history.

St Stephen's Uniting Church has strong associations with the life and work of:
 successive Presbyterian Ministers who provided leadership both to St Stephen's and within the presbyterian and Uniting Churches as they developed, including Rev. Dr Steel, Rev John Ferguson, Rev. James McLeod and Rev. Gordon Powell.
 Statesmen, including NSW State Governors Sir John Northcott, Sir Eric Woodward (Both were honoured with State Funerals at St Stephen's), James Cameron Speaker of the NSW Legislative Assembly, Sir Leslie Herron, NSW Chief Justice.
 The individuals and families commemorated in its memorials.
 Notable individuals including Rev Dr J. Fred McKay, successor to Rev. John Flynn of the inland, associate Minister St Stephen's 1974 to 1986, Messrs Bob Joss and Robert White, Managing Directors of Westpac.
Architects, John Reid and Finlay Munro Junior.

The place is important in demonstrating aesthetic characteristics and/or a high degree of creative or technical achievement in New South Wales.

St Stephen's Uniting Church is aesthetically distinctive as an Inter-War Gothic style church located on one of Sydney's most notable street.  Its aesthetic merit lies in the adaptation of Gothic references to a modern church building to reinforce a strong traditional image.  It draws on forms from the English "Perpendicular (Gothic) Style" characterised by strong vertical lines in window tracery and wall panelling, vaults and an elaborately decorated copper lantern.  This is carried out in contemporary construction utilizing traditional materials and demonstrating a high degree of design skill and craftsmanship.  It incorporates fabric in the form of memorials and stained glass windows from the Phillip Street Church.

The place has a strong or special association with a particular community or cultural group in New South Wales for social, cultural or spiritual reasons.

St Stephen's is socially significant initially as the principal Presbyterian Church in New South Wales and since Union as the principal Uniting Church of New South Wales.  Its history is interwoven with the development of the Presbyterian and Uniting Churches in NSW and Australia, in which it played a leading role.

Music 
St Stephen's is known for its music ministry.

The St Stephen's Scholarship Programme awards scholarships to students studying music at the Sydney Conservatorium of Music. Grants for scholarships are provided by the St Stephen's Sydney Music and Cultural Foundation.

St Stephen's hosts the Friday Music concert series, in which every Friday lunchtime classical musicians perform. Takings from the concert support the performers and the scholarship programme.

Jazz Behind The Green Door is a monthly jazz night featuring emerging jazz musicians.

The current Music Director is Mark Quarmby and the current Choral Director is Dr Huw Belling.

See also 

Australian non-residential architectural styles
List of Uniting churches in Sydney

References

Bibliography

Attribution

External links

Sydney
Uniting churches in Sydney
Articles incorporating text from the New South Wales State Heritage Register
Churches completed in 1937
1937 establishments in Australia
Sandstone churches in Australia
Macquarie Street, Sydney